The 1983 Asia Golf Circuit was the 22nd season of golf tournaments that comprised the Asia Golf Circuit.

Taiwan's Lu Chien-soon claimed the overall circuit title.

Tournament schedule
The table below shows the 1983 Asian Golf Circuit schedule.

Final standings
The Asia Golf Circuit operated a points based system to determine the overall circuit champion, with points being awarded in each tournament to the leading players. At the end of the season, the player with the most points was declared the circuit champion, and there was a prize pool to be shared between the top players in the points table.

References

Asia Golf Circuit
Asia Golf Circuit